Edwin Matthew Saenz (September 21, 1923 – April 28, 1971) was an American football running back for the Washington Redskins of the National Football League.  He played college football at the University of Southern California and was drafted in the 15th round of the 1945 NFL Draft. Saenz was given the nickname "tortilla" because of his Mexican American heritage.

Eddie was a causal factor in USC's winning the 1944 Rose Bowl.  He enlisted in the Navy prior to the end of World War II and played football with the Great Lakes Naval Academy.  A career-ending injury forced Eddie to retire after five years with the Washington Redskins where he played both offense as a halfback and defense.  After his retirement from football, he worked as a stunt man for various movies and often served as a double for Anthony Quinn.  Eddie died at age 48 leaving a widow and nine children.

References

1923 births
1971 deaths
American football halfbacks
Great Lakes Navy Bluejackets football players
USC Trojans football players
Washington Redskins players
United States Navy personnel of World War II
Players of American football from Santa Monica, California
American sportspeople of Mexican descent